This is a complete list of all the singles that entered the VG-lista - the official Norwegian hit-chart - in 1958, which was the first year of the list. 19 singles entered the VG-lista in 1958 altogether and these are all listed below according to how well they have charted over time.

Detailed listing of number-one hits in 1958

Top singles of 1958

External links 
 VG-Lista - the official Norwegian hit-chart
 VG-lista - Top 100 singles of all time in Norway

1958 record charts
Norwegian record charts
Norwegian music-related lists
1958 in Norwegian music